The Canadian Ambassador to Myanmar in Yangon is the official representative of the Government of Canada in Ottawa to the Government of Myanmar.

History
Until August 14, 2013, the Canadian Ambassador to Thailand in Bangkok was accredited concurrently to the government in Naypyidaw.

List of representatives

References 

 
Myanmar
Canada